The Hindu Literary Prize or The Hindu Best Fiction Award, established in 2010, is an Indian literary award sponsored by The Hindu Literary Review which is part of the newspaper The Hindu. It recognizes Indian works in English and English translation. The first year, 2010, the award was called The Hindu Best Fiction Award. Starting in 2018 a non-fiction category was included.

Winners and shortlist

Blue Ribbon = winner.

2010
 Serious Men, Manu Joseph
Eunuch Park, Palash Krishna Mehrotra
The Pleasure Seekers, Tishani Doshi
Venus Crossing, Kalpana Swaminathan
Come, Before Evening Falls, Manjul Bajaj
Saraswati Park, Anjali Joseph
If I Could Tell You, Soumya Bhattacharya
The Thing About Thugs, Tabish Khair
The To-Let House, Daisy Hasan
Way to Go, Upamanyu Chatterjee
Neti, Neti, Anjum Hasan

2011
 The Sly Company of People Who Care by Rahul Bhattacharya
Bharathipura, translated work of U. R. Ananthamurthy, translated by Sushila Punitha
The Fakir, translated work of Sunil Gangopadhyay, translated by Monabi Mitra
River of Smoke by Amitav Ghosh
Litanies of Dutch Battery, translated work of N. S. Madhavan, translated by Rajesh Raja Mohan
The Folded Earth by Anuradha Roy
The Storyteller of Marrakesh by Joydeep Roy-Bhattacharya

2012
 Em and the Big Hoom by Jerry Pinto
Narcopolis, Jeet Thayil
The Extras, Kiran Nagarkar 
Difficult Pleasures, Anjum Hasan 
Bitter Wormwood, Easterine Kire

2013
The Illicit Happiness of Other People, Manu Joseph
Foreign, Sonora Jha
Roll of Honour, Amandeep Sandhu
  Vanity Bagh, Anees Salim
Another Man's Wife and Other Stories, Manjul Bajaj

2014
The Competent Authority, Shovon Chowdhury
Shadow Play, Shashi Deshpande
A Bad Character, Deepti Kapur
Idris, Keeper of the Light, Anita Nair
The Mysterious Ailment of Rupi Baskey, Hansda Sowvendra Shekhar
 The Book of Common Signs, Ashok Srinivasan

2015
Flood of Fire, Amitav Ghosh
Odysseus Abroad, Amit Chaudhuri
Seahorse, Janice Pariat
Sleeping on Jupiter, Anuradha Roy
The Patna Manual of Style, Siddharth Chowdhury
 When the River Sleeps, Easterine Kire

2016

Half of What I Say, Anil Menon
 Jinnah Often Came To Our House, Kiran Doshi
Kalkutta, Kunal Basu
The Adivasi Will Not Dance: Stories, Hansda Sowvendra Shekhar
The Island of Lost Girls, Manjula Padmanabhan

2017

Leila, Prayaag Akbar
When I Hit You, Meena Kandasamy
The Ministry of Utmost Happiness, Arundhati Roy
The Small Town Sea, Anees Salim
 Temporary People, Deepak Unnikrishnan

2018
 Fiction
Half the Night is Gone, Amitabha Bagchi
A Day in the Life, Anjum Hasan
All the Lives We Never Lived, Anuradha Roy
Poonachi, Perumal Murugan (translated from Tamil by N. Kalyan Raman)
The Aunt Who Wouldn't Die, Shirshendu Mukhopadhyay (translated from Bengali by Arunava Sinha) 
 Requiem in Raga Janki, Neelum Saran Gour
Non-fiction
 Interrogating my Chandal Life: An Autobiography of a Dalit, Manoranjan Byapari, translated by Sipra Mukherjee
The Bengalis: A Portrait of a Community, Sudeep Chakravarti
Remnants of a Separation: A History of the Partition through Material Memory, Aanchal Malhotra
Indira Gandhi: A Life in Nature, Jairam Ramesh
The Most Dangerous Place:A History of the United States in South Asia, Srinath Raghavan

2019
 Fiction
 The Assassination of Indira Gandhi, Upamanyu Chatterjee
 Tell Her Everything, Mirza Waheed
 The Queen of Jasmine Country, Sharanya Mannivanan
 Latitudes of Longing, Shubangi Swarup
 Heat, Poomani Kalyan Raman
 Non-fiction 
 Early Indians: The Story of Our Ancestors and Where We Came From, Tony Joseph
 Polio: The Odyssey of Eradication, Thomas Abraham
 The Transformative Constitution: A Radical Biography in Nine Acts, Gautam Bhatia
 India, Empire, and First World War Culture, Santanu Das
 The Anatomy of Hate, Revati Laul

See also
Lit for Life

References

Awards established in 2011
Indian literary awards
Fiction awards